The gall mite genus Pentamerus, established by Roivainen in 1951, is invalid and needs to be renamed. Until this happens, use Pentamerus (mite).

Pentamerus (meaning "five thighs") is a prehistoric genus of brachiopods that lived from the Silurian to the Middle Devonian in Asia, Europe, and North America.

See also

Pentamerus Range

Sources
 Fossils (Smithsonian Handbooks) by David Ward (Page 82)

External links
Pentamerus in the Paleobiology Database

Rhynchonellata
Prehistoric brachiopod genera
Silurian brachiopods
Devonian brachiopods
Paleozoic animals of Asia
Prehistoric animals of Europe
Paleozoic brachiopods of North America
Silurian first appearances
Middle Devonian genus extinctions
Fossils of Georgia (U.S. state)
Jeffersonville Limestone
Paleozoic life of Ontario
Paleozoic life of British Columbia
Paleozoic life of Manitoba
Paleozoic life of New Brunswick
Paleozoic life of the Northwest Territories
Paleozoic life of Quebec